Yūgi is a Japanese given name. It may refer to:

People 
 Yugi Sethu (born 1964), Tamil actor, director and screenwriter

Characters

Given name 
 Yugi Mutou, the main character of Yu-Gi-Oh!
 Yugi (Tenchi Muyo!), a character in Tenchi in Tokyo
 Yugi Hoshiguma, a character in Touhou Project video games

See also 
 Bangjja, also called yugi, a Korean type of hand-forged bronzeware
 Fushigi Yûgi, a Japanese manga series
 Yu-Gi-Oh!, a Japanese manga series

Japanese masculine given names